Seven ships of the Royal Navy have borne the name HMS Hydra, after the Lernaean Hydra of Greek mythology:

  was a 24-gun sixth rate launched in 1778 and sold in 1783.
  was a 38-gun fifth rate launched in 1797.  She was used as a troopship from 1812 and was sold in 1820.
  was a wooden steam  paddle sloop launched in 1838, used as a survey vessel after 1852, paid off in 1868 and sold in 1870.
  was a  turret ship launched in 1871 and sold in 1903.
  was an  launched in 1912 and sold in 1921.
  was an  launched in 1942.  She was damaged by a mine in 1944 and not repaired.  She was scrapped in 1945.
  was an oceanographic survey vessel launched in 1965, sold to Indonesia in 1986 and renamed Dewa Kembar.

Battle honours
Syria 1840
Dogger Bank 1915
Jutland 1916
North Sea 1943
Arctic 1943-44
Normandy 1944
South Atlantic 1982

Royal Navy ship names